Gino Cuccarolo (born November 26, 1987 in Asolo, Italy) is an Italian professional basketball player. He is a 2.22 m (7 ft 3 " in) tall center.

Professional career
Cuccarolo began his professional career with the Italian League club Basket Treviso, during the Italian League 2003–04 season. He is the 4th youngest player to play in the EuroLeague, since the year 2000, starting in the Euroleague for the first time on his 16th birthday.

Italian national team
Cuccarolo was a member of the junior national teams of Italy. With Italy's junior national teams, he played at the following tournaments: the 2003 FIBA Europe Under-16 Championship, the 2005 FIBA Europe Under-18 Championship, where he won a bronze medal, the 2006 FIBA Europe Under-20 Championship, and the 2007 FIBA Europe Under-20 Championship, where he won a bronze medal.

See also 
 List of tallest people
 List of youngest EuroLeague players

References

External links

Twitter Account
FIBA Archive Profile
FIBA Europe Profile
Euroleague.net Profile
Italian League Profile 
Eurobasket.com Profile
Draftexpress.com Profile

1987 births
Living people
Auxilium Pallacanestro Torino players
Basket Brescia Leonessa players
Centers (basketball)
Italian men's basketball players
Lega Basket Serie A players
Montecatiniterme Basketball players
Pallacanestro Biella players
Pallacanestro Treviso players
Reyer Venezia players
Virtus Bologna players